Bofferdange is a small town in the commune of Lorentzweiler, in central Luxembourg.  , the town has a population of 772.

References

Lorentzweiler
Towns in Luxembourg